Brad Allan Myers is a professor in the Human-Computer Interaction Institute at Carnegie Mellon University. He earned his PhD in computer science at the University of Toronto in 1987, under Bill Buxton.

In 2017, Brad Myers received the Association for Computing Machinery's SIGCHI Lifetime Achievement Award in Research, for outstanding fundamental and influential research contributions to the study of human-computer interaction. Myers is the winner of nine best paper type awards and three Most Influential Paper awards and is the author or editor of 475 publications.
, Myers was the 28th most published author in the field of human-computer interaction. He was elected to the CHI Academy in 2004 as one of the "principal leaders of the field" of HCI and is an IEEE Fellow and an ACM Fellow. Myers is a leading researcher in the field of programming by demonstration and created the Garnet and Amulet toolkits. He is one of a select few who has attended every CHI conference. You can see documentation online of his extensive collection of CHI ribbons.

Education 
Myers received his BS degree in Computer Science and MS degree in Computer Science and Engineering under MIT in 1980, whilst simultaneously interning at Xerox Parc for his Master’s thesis. He then received his PhD in Computer Science from the University of Toronto in 1987.

Work 
Myers's work is focused on building computer systems, most of them have rock-themed names. His work since the 1970s at many distinguished institutes including Xerox Parc, MIT Architecture Machine Group (Now the Media Lab), and the Three Rivers Computer Corporation pioneered many systems and innovations that are still in use today. His work with window managers produced SAPPHIRE in the early 1980s, while working for PERQ Systems Corporation. It is one of the first commercial window managers with feature that became widely adopted such as progress bars.

Myers’s MIT Master’s thesis was one of the earliest data visualization systems. While working for PERQ Systems Corporation in the early 80s, Myers created Sapphire, one of the first commercial window managers with a number of features that later became widespread.

His University of Toronto dissertation described Peridot, a programming by demonstration system that specified the look and behaviors of widgets without conventional programming.

He has done a number of research projects on handheld devices, such as the Pebbles, exploring the different uses of these devices and how they communicate with other systems. Another focus of Myers's work is the Natural Programming project. It focuses on programming languages and making programming easier and more correct by making it more natural.

Memberships 
Journal of Visual Languages and Sentient Systems.

Journal of Visual Languages and Computing.

Human-Computer Interaction Journal.

Interacting with Computers.

References

External links
Brad Myers's website
Human-Computer Interaction Institute
Amulet
Garnet

American computer scientists
Human–computer interaction researchers
Living people
Human-Computer Interaction Institute faculty
Year of birth missing (living people)